Live in Atlantic City is a live video album by American recording artist Beyoncé. It was released on November 22, 2013 through Columbia Records and Parkwood Entertainment as a part of the home video release of her autobiographical television film Life Is But a Dream. The concert film contains footage from Beyoncé's four-night residency show at Revel Casino Hotel Atlantic City in Atlantic City, New Jersey, titled Revel Presents: Beyoncé Live between May 25–28, 2012, and was directed by Ed Burke and Beyoncé herself. It encompasses live performances of twenty-one songs, in addition to Beyoncé's then-new song "God Made You Beautiful".

After the film was released, videos of three performances from the concert were released online on Beyoncé's YouTube channel—"Schoolin' Life", "Dance for You" and "Party". Live in Atlantic City was commercially successful, peaking within the top ten on various DVD charts worldwide. The two-disc set of Life Is But a Dream/Live in Atlantic City peaked atop the US Top Music Videos and the UK Music Video Chart, becoming Beyoncé's fourth and first chart-topper in the countries, respectively. It was certified platinum by the British Phonographic Industry (BPI) and gold by the Australian Recording Industry Association (ARIA).

Background
On February 16, 2013, Beyoncé released Life Is But a Dream, an autobiographical television film. It premiered on HBO, garnering 1.8 million viewers for the initial broadcast, becoming the largest audience for a documentary since Nielsen Media Research revised its method of measuring viewership in 2004. However, critical commentary towards Life Is But a Dream was mixed with divided opinions by critics.

Film synopsis

Live in Atlantic City contains live performances of twenty-one songs along with a new song "God Made You Beautiful", written by Australian singer-songwriter Sia. Several short excerpts of the performances found on the film are also featured in Life Is But a Dream itself. The film opens with Beyoncé appearing in front of a large screen with her silhouette being seen. As the music of "End of Time" starts, she performs a choreography with her female dancers and French duo Les Twins on stage further singing the song's lyrics. "Get Me Bodied" follows with a similarly choreographed performance and for the third song "Baby Boy", the singer dances with her background dancers in front of a holographic background performing a Dutty Wine dance at the end. "Crazy in Love" and "Diva" are featured as the fourth and fifth song, respectively. "Naughty Girl" is preceded by a video projection with a voice-over by Beyoncé talking about female sexuality. A snippet of Donna Summer's "Love to Love You Baby" is interpolated within it and the singer performs the song with her female dancers. She continues with "Party" for which a prominent Las Vegas showgirl theme is featured.

Prior to starting "Dance for You", Beyoncé announces to the audience that she is going to dance to the song without singing it. "Freakum Dress" opens with a short interlude during which several dancers appear onstage dancing with long dresses. Beyoncé appears and performs the song, interacting with her guitarist towards the end. "I Care" is performed by the singer alone on stage and during "Schoolin' Life" a laser show is displayed for a choreographed dance. "1+1" sees Beyoncé singing the song atop a piano and "Flaws and All" follows. "Run the World (Girls)" is preceded by a video interlude set to the music of "Countdown", shown on the screen onstage. A video featuring various footage from Beyoncé's life follows as she recites the lyrics from her song "I Was Here". After that, she performs the opening lines of "I Will Always Love You" a cappella as a tribute to Whitney Houston and continues with her own song "Halo". "Single Ladies (Put a Ring on It) is performed afterwards with the same choreography from its music video and "Green Light" is used as the encore. "Love on Top" is the last song on Live in Atlantic City, performed by Beyoncé and her dancers as the credits for the concert film are shown.

"God Made You Beautiful" is featured as a bonus audio song on the album and it premiered online on November 22, 2013. It is a down-tempo ballad, with a staccato beat and a gospel-tinged chorus. Instrumentally, it consists of drums, strings, pianos, runs and hand claps. It opens with an "echoey" a cappella choir and it lyrically talks about Beyoncé and Jay-Z's daughter Blue Ivy as the singer tells that she "brought me back to life/you bring me back to life."

Release
Live in Atlantic Citys home video release for DVD and Blu-ray formats was announced on October 30, 2013 along with a trailer. During the video, it was revealed that the release included a two-disc set, with the second part, Live in Atlantic City, being bonus concert footage filmed during Beyoncé's four-night residency show Revel Presents: Beyoncé Live at Revel Atlantic City between May 25–28, 2012. A new song, titled "God Made You Beautiful", was also featured on the concert film and heard as the background music in the trailer. The home media release was made available for pre-order on November 1, 2013. Live in Atlantic City was first released in Germany and the Netherlands on November 22, 2013 as part of the two-disc set of Life Is But a Dream. Three days later, the DVD was also released in the United States, Canada and the United Kingdom, and the Blu-ray edition was released in the latter country the same day. In the United States, the Blu-ray edition was released on December 17, 2013.

After the film was released, videos of the performances of three songs were released online. The performance of "Schoolin' Life" from the film was previewed on Beyoncé's official YouTube channel on November 25, 2013. A writer of Vibe magazine felt that the laser light show from the performance "brighten[ed] up Atlantic City". The performance of "Dance for You" was also uploaded to the singer's channel two days later. The live rendition of "Party" was the final uploaded video from the concert film on December 2. John Walker of MTV reviewed it positively writing: "The sparkling, goddess-like centerpiece in a swirling sea of pink feathers, Beyoncé shines like a true showgirl on stage. Thankfully, unlike the 1995 camp classic, none of her backup dancers look nefarious enough to try anything funny". Walker further praised Beyoncé's vocals and dance moves as "on point as always" and the "flawlessly areolicious bustier" she wore.

Commercial performance
On November 30, 2013, Live in Atlantic City debuted at number four on the Dutch Music DVD Chart and later peaked at number two. The same week it also debuted at number ten on the Belgian Music DVD Chart in Flanders and at number thirty on the French Music DVD Chart. The next week, the album moved to number nine on the French Music DVD Chart, setting a new peak position in that country. On the Spanish Music DVD Chart it peaked at number eleven on November 25, 2013, which became its only placement outside of the top ten on a DVD chart.

The album debuted at number one in the United Kingdom on December 7, 2013, becoming Beyoncé's first UK Music Video Chart number-one. It remained at the top in its second week, before falling to number two by One Night at the Palladium (2013) by Robbie Williams the following week. It spent six more weeks within the top five on the chart and it was seen for the last time on May 31, 2014 at number forty, having spent a total of twenty-six weeks on the chart. On December 27, 2013 the British Phonographic Industry (BPI) certified the album platinum for shipments of 50,000 copies in the United Kingdom. In the United States, Live in Atlantic City became Beyoncé's fourth number-one album on the Top Music Videos chart, debuting on top for the week of December 14, 2013. In Australia, the album peaked at number two on the chart and was certified gold by the Australian Recording Industry Association (ARIA) for shipments of 7,500 copies.

Track listing

Personnel
Credits for Live in Atlantic City taken from the album's liner notes and Beyoncé's official website.

Creative director – Beyoncé
Director of choreography – Frank D. Gatson Jr.
Musical director – Kim Burse, Derek Dixie
Visual content directors –  Beyoncé, Ed Burke
Lighting designer –  LeRoy Bennett
Band –  Rebecca Buxton, Cora Coleman-Dunham, Kiku Collins, Bibi McGill, Katty Rodríguez-Harrold, Lauren Taneil Robinson, Rie Tsuji, Britanni Washington
Background vocals –  Crystal Collins, Montina Donnell, Tiffany Riddick
Dance captain –  Ashley Everett
Dancers – Larry Bourgeois, Laurent Bourgeois, Sarah Burns, Anthony Burrell, Tanesha Cason, Olivia Cipolla, Hannah Douglas, Amandy Fernández, Kimmie Gipson, Christina Owens, Ryan Ramírez
Co-choreographers –  Chris Grant, JaQuel Knight
Assistant choreographer –  Danielle Polanco
Contributing choreographers – Beyoncé, James Aslop, Larry Bourgeois, Laurent Bourgeois, Anthony Burrell, Rhapsody James, Jonte Moaning, Sheryl Murakami, Christian Owens, Michelle Robinson, Ebony Williams
Assistant to choreographers –  Kristopher Mohfanz
Director of wardrobe – Tina Knowles
Head stylist –  Ty Hunter
Stylist – Raquel Smith
Wardrobe assistants –  Enid Gayle, Amber Glaspie, Taneka McLeod, Kwasi Fordjour
Designers – Swarovski Crystals provided by Ralph & Russo, Dolce & Gabbana, David Koma, The Blonds, Stuart Weitzman and Scott Nylund, Timothy White and Enid Gayle for Tina Knowles
Make-up artist – Francesca Tolot
Hair stylist –  Neal Farinah
Nail stylist –  Lisa Logan
Band/dancers make-up –  Crissy Gómez, Erica Martínez, Rashad Taylor, Yuki Ara
Band/dancers hair –  Yolanda Ward, Nikki Nelms, Eric Williams
Additional show content –  Alexander Hammer, Melina Matsoukas
Show content writer –  Angela Beyincé
Additional content assistant –  William Boisture
Light board operator –  Cory Fitzgerald
Image director –  Kevin Carswell
Video server operation –  Marc Andre Tremblay
Digital media operator –  Kevin Ryan
Guitar tech –  Sean O'Brian
Keyboard tech –  Cody Orell
Drum tech –  Marco Zambrano
Crew chief/FOH cam –  John Dennis Bedell
LED tech/FOD cam –  Russell Wingfield
LED tech/dolly cam –  Jeffrey Michael Gainer
LED tech –  Chad McClymonds
Projectionist –  Craig Leibowitz
Projectionist/handheld cam –  Christopher Alan Campbell
LED/KI pro recording tech –  Tyler Munson
Engineer –  Randall Schaffer
LED engineer –  Dustin King
Project manager video –  Barry Claxton
FOH engineer –  Christopher Rabold
Band monitor engineer –  Chauncey Burney
Beyoncé monitor engineer –  James Berry
System engineer –  Christopher Berry
Monitor tech –  John Switzer
RF/P.A. –  Victor Arko
Head electric –  David Bergeron
Electricians –  Antoine Malette, Scott Allan Walsh, Jean Francois Malette, Alex Boldue, Eric Cere
Automation operator –  Eric Pelletier
Head rigger –  Pat Ryan
Head carpenter –  William Shewmaker
Project manager set & props –  Tim Fallon
Sets –  Bryan Alexander Schluntz, Kevin William Levasseur, Bobby Lee Marshall
Production assistant –  Ashlee Senser
Venue security –  Pete Beattle
Tour manager –  Alan Floyd
Visual content –  Breathe Editing Inc.
Show production manager –  Alex Miasnikof
Assistant show production manager –  Shari Weber
Set designer –  Florian Weider
Supervising art director –  Talyn Wright
Stage manager –  Terry Cooley
Theatrical director –  Jennita Russo

Charts

Weekly charts

Year-end charts

Certifications

Release history

Notes

References

External links
 Official website
 Official HBO website 

2013 video albums
Beyoncé video albums
Beyoncé albums
Albums produced by Beyoncé
Culture of Atlantic City, New Jersey
Live video albums